Raja Annamalaipuram, known in short as R. A. Puram, is a neighbourhood of Chennai, India. Named after banker and philanthropist, S. Rm. M. Annamalai Chettiar who owned most of the property at one time, Raja Annamalaipuram extends along the northern banks of the Adyar River from Saidapet to the Bay of Bengal coast. PIN (Postal) Code for both Mandavelipakkam and Raja Annamalaipuram is 600 028. The neighbourhood adjoins localities such as Mylapore and Mandaveli.

References 
 

Neighbourhoods in Chennai